Ablaberoides oscurifrons is a species of  bugs first discovered by  Moser in 1920. No sub-species are listed in Catalogue of Life.

References

Scarabaeinae
Beetles described in 1920